Coralloid (coral-shaped) may refer to:
 Cave popcorn, small nodes of calcite, aragonite or gypsum that form on surfaces in caves
 Coral shaped forms in plants such as roots of cycads